Shawn Willis Riggans (born July 25, 1980) is a former professional baseball catcher for the Tampa Bay Rays, spending parts of four seasons with the club from 2006 through 2009.

Personal life
Riggans was born in Fort Lauderdale, Florida to John and Patricia Riggans. He played for St. Thomas Aquinas High School as a reserve player, in part to his small size, and upon entering college at Florida International University he was initially rejected from the team. After performing well during a subsequent opportunity he earned a spot on the roster. Receiving more experience following a transfer to Indian River Community College Riggans was noticed and drafted in the 24th round (706th overall) of the 2000 MLB Draft by the Tampa Bay Devil Rays.

Riggans' mother died while in need of a liver transplant in 2001. He would subsequently say a prayer to his mother during the national anthem prior to the start of each game.

Career

Minor Leagues
In his first season in the Rays' organization, Riggans hit .345 with 8 home runs in 15 games for the Princeton Devil Rays (Tampa Bay's then-rookie ball affiliate). He preceded to earn the Rays' minor league defensive catcher of the year award four times. He would spend a total of six seasons in the Rays' minor league system before being called up as part of the September roster expansion in 2006.

Major Leagues
Riggans' major league debut came on September 5, 2006, when Rays manager Joe Maddon pinch hit Riggans for Rocco Baldelli in the ninth inning of a game against the Minnesota Twins; he proceeded to get a hit to center field. He would finish the remainder of the season with five hits in 29 at-bats in 10 games.

After appearing in only three games in the 2007 season, Riggans' most significant season came in 2008, appearing in 44 games and hitting a .222 average with 6 home runs and 24 runs batted in while serving as the back up catcher to Dioner Navarro. The Rays would win the American League pennant that year, defeating the Chicago White Sox in the American League Division Series and the Boston Red Sox in the American League Championship Series, before falling to the Philadelphia Phillies in the 2008 World Series. Though Riggans made the postseason roster, he did not appear in any games during any of the series.

Riggans would again receive some playing time at the major league level in 2009, appearing in seven games for the club.

Subsequent
In 2010 Riggans signed a minor league contract with the New York Mets organization; after being released by that club he played for the New Jersey Jackals of the Independent Can-Am League. He would sign another minor league contract in 2011, this time with the Milwaukee Brewers organization, but did not appear in any games with the big league club and was granted free agency at the end of the year, effectively ending his career as a professional ballplayer.

References

External links

 Shawn Riggans Baseball Stats by Baseball Almanac

1980 births
Living people
Baseball players from Fort Lauderdale, Florida
St. Thomas Aquinas High School (Florida) alumni
Major League Baseball catchers
Tampa Bay Devil Rays players
Tampa Bay Rays players
Princeton Devil Rays players
Hudson Valley Renegades players
Indian River State Pioneers baseball players
Charleston RiverDogs players
Orlando Rays players
Bakersfield Blaze players
Montgomery Biscuits players
Durham Bulls players
Vero Beach Devil Rays players
Charlotte Stone Crabs players
Binghamton Mets players
Buffalo Bisons (minor league) players
New Jersey Jackals players
Huntsville Stars players
FIU Panthers baseball players